Franz Schimmelpfennig von der Oye (died 1799) was the German President of Warsaw during the Prussian occupation.

Mayors of Warsaw
1799 deaths
Year of birth missing